These are the official results of the Women's javelin throw event at the 2002 European Championships in Munich, Germany. There were a total number of 21 participating athletes. The final was held on Thursday August 8, 2002, and the qualifying round on Tuesday August 6, 2002 with the mark set at 61.00 metres.

Medalists

Schedule
All times are Central European Time (UTC+1)

Abbreviations
All results shown are in metres

Records

Qualification

Group A

Group B

Final

See also
 1999 Women's World Championships Javelin Throw (Seville)
 2000 Women's Olympic Javelin Throw (Sydney)
 2001 Women's World Championships Javelin Throw (Edmonton)
 2003 Women's World Championships Javelin Throw (Paris)
 2004 Women's Olympic Javelin Throw (Athens)
 2005 Women's World Championships Javelin Throw (Helsinki)

References
 Results
 todor66

Javelin throw
Javelin throw at the European Athletics Championships
2002 in women's athletics